Municipal elections were held in Toronto, Ontario, Canada, on January 1, 1916. Mayor Tommy Church was elected to his second term in office.

Toronto mayor
Church had first been elected mayor the year previous. In the words of the Toronto Daily Star the mayoral contest "was something of a joke" as Church was only opposed by Harry Winberg, who had never before held elected office. Church ignored his opponent during the campaign, and was easily returned.

Results
Tommy Church (incumbent)  - 28,541
Harry Winberg - 9,880

Board of Control
There was one change to the Board of Control. R.H. Cameron won a seat while Frank S. Spence was defeated.

Joseph Elijah Thompson (incumbent) -18,209
John O'Neill (incumbent) - 17,572
Thomas Foster (incumbent) - 16,085
R.H. Cameron - 15,391
James Simpson - 13,080
Frank S. Spence (incumbent)  - 12,652
John Dunn - 11,009

City council

Ward 1 (Riverdale)
William D. Robbins (incumbent) - 4,283
A.H. Wagstaff - 4,011
W. W. Hiltz - 3,657
Albert Walton (incumbent) - 2,866
Robert Yeomans  (incumbent) - 2,590
Walter Brown - 913

Ward 2 (Cabbagetown and Rosedale)
Charles A. Risk (incumbent) - 2,550
J.R. Beamish - 2,499
Herbert Henry Ball (incumbent) - 2,093
Charles Beavis - 1,946
Thomas Barber - 729

Ward 3 (Central Business District and The Ward)
Charles A. Maguire (incumbent) - 3,397
J. George Ramsden (incumbent) - 2,154
Sam McBride (incumbent) - 1,971
Thomas Vance - 1,666

Ward 4 (Kensington Market and Garment District)
Arthur Russell Nesbitt - 2,652
John Cowan (incumbent)  - 2,374
Louis Singer (incumbent) - 2,177
A.W. Miles - 1,954

Ward 5 (Trinity-Bellwoods)
Garnet Archibald - 2,808
R.H. Graham - 2,789
W.R. Plewman - 2,006
John Warren (incumbent)  - 1,860
Joseph May - 1,571
John Wesley Meredith (incumbent) - 1,439
George Hagar - 1,373
James Thompson - 1,290
Alfred Moore - 388

Ward 6 (Brockton and Parkdale)
Fred McBrien - 4,512
Joseph Gibbons (incumbent) - 4,414
D.C. MacGregor - 4,006
George Birdsall - 3,890
Thomas Roden (incumbent) - 2,319

Ward 7 (West Toronto Junction)
Samuel Ryding (incumbent) - 1,420
Frank Whetter - 1,252
William Henry Weir (incumbent)- 1,106

Results taken from the January 1, 1916 Toronto Daily Star and might not exactly match final tallies.

References
Election Coverage. Toronto Star. January 1, 1916

1916 elections in Canada
1916
1916 in Ontario